Shahyar may refer to:

 Shahyar Ghanbari (b. 1950), Iranian songwriter
 Shahyar, Iran, a village in Kermanshah Province, Iran